Henry Burgess may refer to:
Henry Givens Burgess (1859–1937), Irish railway executive
Henry Burgess (priest) (1808–1886), English clergyman
Henry Burgess (cricketer) (1879–1964), English cricketer
Henry William Burgess (c. 1792–1839), British artist

See also
Harry Burgess (disambiguation)
Norman Wettenhall (Henry Norman Burgess Wettenhall, 1915–2000), Australian paediatric endocrinologist and ornithologist